Justin Achilli is best known as an author and developer for White Wolf, Inc.

Career
Justin Achilli began working at White Wolf in 1995. Achilli has contributed as an author for numerous Vampire: The Masquerade and Vampire: The Requiem titles, and acted as the developer for the launch of Vampire: The Requiem. Achilli has also contributed to Werewolf, Mage, Promethean, Changeling, Ravenloft, and other titles. He was promoted to Editing & Development Manager at White Wolf in 2005.

He has worked on over 100 Vampire titles.

Achilli co-designed the Exalted role-playing game with Steve Wieck and Robert Hatch, and the game was published in 2001; author Shannon Appelcline noted that the game "was both well-received and commercially successful", unlike many of the later games from White Wolf.

Achilli was one of the guests at Project A-Kon in 2006.

References

External links 
 Official website

American gamebook writers
Living people
Place of birth missing (living people)
Role-playing game designers
White Wolf game designers
Year of birth missing (living people)